Daporijo is a census town in the Upper Subansiri district, Indian state of Arunachal Pradesh in the Northeast of India.

Nomenclature

Originally Dapo referred to "protection" or "the barrier" against the epidemic or evil spirits while Rijo stood for "the valley". It hosts the headquarters of Upper Subansiri district.  It is a beautiful town situated amidst endless hillocks, atop the river Subansiri, known for the Daporijo Bridge- a BRO undertaking as one of the swiftest ever: a bridge built in only 27 days in April 2020.

Demographics
 India census, Daporijo had a population of 15,468. Males constitute 52% of the population and females 48%. Daporijo has an average literacy rate of 59%, lower than the national average of 59.5%: male literacy is 66% and, female literacy is 51%. In Daporijo, 19% of the population is under 6 years of age. Daporijo is the headquarters of the Upper Subansiri District, which is the homeland of three ethnic groups, the Tagin, Galo, and Nyishi tribes. It is a Tagin majority area, with prominent sub-groups or clans Leyu, Tamin, Tasi, Gidu Gingu, Reri, Mra, Nah, etc..

Governance
Taniya Soki is the MLA of 24th Daporijo constituency (as of April-2019), and the Deputy Commissioner-cum-District Magistrate is Kanto Dangen APCS (as of jan 2021). Taru Gusar is the SP (Superintendent of Police) of the Daporijo township.

Topography
Daporijo is located at an elevation of 600 m above sea level. It is located beside the river Subansiri, one of the principal rivers of Arunachal Pradesh, and a major tributary of the mighty Brahmaputra Daporijo valley is surrounded by Evergreen hills in three corners and Subansiri river in the other.

Most famous places around Daporijo are Menga Mandir, Sippi, etc..

Transport connectivity 

Daporji is on the NH13 which is part of larger Trans-Arunachal Highway. A strategic road was constructed by BRO in 2017 in Kurung Kumey district between Huri (which is already connected to Koloriang) and Sarli after heavy construction equipment was heli-airlifted from Ziro, which will enable Koloriang-Huri-Sarli-Taliha-Daporijo connectivity by facilitating the construction of the remaining Sarli-Taliha section. Once Taliha-Daporijo, Taliha-Nacho, Taliha-Tato (head quarter of Shi Yomi district are completed, all of which were under construction in February 2021 while facing land acquisition issues, it will provide the strategic frontier connectivity from Seppa-Tamsang Yangfo-Sarili-Koloriang-Sarili-Nacho(and beyond to Daporijo-Taksing)-Tato(and beyond to Mechuka-Gelling and Aalo).

Festivals
Si-Donyi Festival, mopin, bori yullo, nyokum festivals of the different tribes makes much festivity around the year.

See also
List of constituencies of Arunachal Pradesh Legislative Assembly
there is a total of 60th constituencies

References

External links
 

Upper Subansiri district
Cities and towns in Upper Subansiri district